The Shamba Raiders: Memories of a Game Warden was written by Bruce Kinloch.  It is a non-fiction account of his experiences in Africa and was first published in 1972. It proved so successful that a revised edition came out in 1988, and then again in 2004.

The title refers to the marauding elephants destroying peasant crops, driven by heavy poaching pressure in wilderness areas, which formed the most urgent task for Kinloch.

That his book is still in demand is a source of pride to him and his wife, Elizabeth, who accompanied him frequently and typed up the notes of his original book. "It is a book that never dies, its contents are as relevant now as ever," she said.

The Shamba Raiders is an account of the struggle to preserve herds of game threatened by modern civilisation, poaching, war and the political and economic changes which have swept Africa in the middle of the last century.  As the Chief Game Warden in Uganda, Tanzania and Malawi, Kinloch walked the tight rope of retaining Africa's wildlife heritage while safeguarding crops and livelihood of the population, featuring ivory poachers and middlemen as well as uncaring and bigoted officials. 

In particular, the book describes Kinloch's management of the Uganda Game and Fisheries Department during the introduction of the Protectorate's first National Parks, the introduction of Nile Perch to the upper Victoria Nile, and the creation of the College of African Wildlife Management.

References
"Eyeball to eyeball with bull elephant," This is Herefordshire. Online Article

1972 non-fiction books
1972 in the environment
1988 in the environment
2004 in the environment
Nature conservation in Uganda
Environmental non-fiction books